The 2006 UK & Ireland Greyhound Racing Year was the 81st year of greyhound racing in the United Kingdom and Ireland.

Summary
The 2005 English Greyhound Derby champion Westmead Hawk became only the fourth greyhound in history to win the Derby for a second time emulating the achievement of Mick the Miller (1929 & 1930), Patricias Hope (1972 & 1973) and Rapid Ranger (2000 & 2001). Returning from winter rest the Nick Savva trained greyhound lost to Fear Me, in the final of the BGRB Scottish Derby before creating his own piece of history.

Westmead Hawk suffered a serious injury later in the year which resulted in him missing the 2006 Irish Greyhound Derby, an event that was won by Razldazl Billy trained by Dolores Ruth. Westmead Hawk was duly voted the Greyhound of the Year. Charlie Lister was Greyhound Trainer of the Year.

Tracks
Rye House Stadium, built in 1935, closed for good on the 15 November, just two years after re-opening.

Competitions
The battle between the countries two top staying (longer distance) greyhounds continued; Greenacre Lin defeated Roxholme Girl in the Golden Jacket final and then Roxholme Girl gained revenge by winning the William Hill TV Trophy. Greenacre Lin won the Cesarewitch and then Roxholme Girl headed for Manchester and claimed victory in the Gold Collar. They both bypassed the Grand Prix which was won by January Tiger trained by Mark Wallis, who had five of the finalists. Greenacre Lin was retired form racing in September and was voted stayer of the year.

News
GRA track Wimbledon lost four trainers during the course of the year. Seamus Cahill and Paul Garland both moved to Walthamstow Stadium followed by Ray Peacock and John Walsh leaving for Romford and Harlow respectively. Two replacements were Jason Foster from Oxford and Paul Donovan from Reading Stadium.

Walthamstow also appointed new trainers in Peter Rich and Kelly Mullins (son of Linda Mullins). Coincidentally earlier in the year Kelly's brother John Mullins had left Walthamstow to concentrate solely on operating an open-race kennel at Capel St. Mary. Oxford's leading trainer Nick Colton joined sister track Hall Green.

An article by the News of the World on the use of cocaine in society also suggests its use is rife in greyhound racing. The National Greyhound Racing Club responds with evidence that in over 70,000 samples taken during the year only four returned positive for cocaine (three of which were from human contamination) leaving just one case. The newspaper failed to print a retraction or apology.

Roll of honour

Principal UK finals

Principal Irish finals

References 

Greyhound racing in the United Kingdom
Greyhound racing in the Republic of Ireland
2006 in British sport
2006 in Irish sport